The Milton Keynes Lightning are an ice hockey team founded in 2002 and then again in 2019 in Milton Keynes, Buckinghamshire. The Lightning (2nd franchise) currently try and play in Britain's second-tier professional league, the National Ice Hockey League (NIHL), since the 2019–20 season. The Lightning (1st franchise) previously turned up in the top tier Elite Ice Hockey League (EIHL) from 2017–2019 , and the tier-3/tier-2 English Premier Ice Hockey League (EPIHL) from 2002–2017. Their home rink is 2,200-seat Planet Ice Arena Milton Keynes, known locally as the MK Arena or the Thunderdome.

Club history

Foundation
Founded in 2002, MK Lightning moved into the empty space left by the departure of the Milton Keynes Kings. The MK Kings were involved in a dispute with rink operators Planet Ice, which led to their relocation to Solihull in May 2002. There they became the Solihull MK Kings before being wound up in April 2003, after a single season.

2002–2006: The early years
The demise of the Ice Hockey Superleague in 2002/03 led to major restructuring of Ice Hockey in the UK. The Milton Keynes Lightning became a founding member of the new Elite Ice Hockey League but competed in the lower English Premier Ice Hockey League. The first Lightning squad was made up mainly of young local players, one Finnish import, Mikko Skinnari and three Canadian imports, Nick Poole as Player Coach, Claude Dumas, and Dwayne Newman. Lightning finished their maiden season in 2nd place, behind Peterborough Phantoms. The two teams met again in the playoff final, with Lightning winning. A rivalry quickly grew between them as they continued to dominate EPL Ice Hockey, MK Lightning were crowned league champions in 2003–04 and 2004–05 as well as dominating the Playoffs until 2006. During this period there was a heavy reliance on Player Coach Nick Poole and Telford born Gary Clarke for points scoring.

2006–2008: League struggle
The 2006–07 season saw Lightning struggle for the first time. A lack of quality new players, core older players leaving, predictable tactics and an improved opposition being the main drivers. The team ended the season in 5th place and were eliminated from the Playoffs in the first round. 2007/08 saw the situation worsen, with a league finish of 6th. This resulted in a roster overhaul for the new season.

2008–2010: Return to success
The Lightning squad for the 2008–09 season included several experienced ex-Elite League players, young British talent and new European imports including Lukas Zatopek, Andre Smulter and Joakim Wiklander as an injury replacement for Ales Perez whose career was ended by a serious shoulder injury. After a slow start the team dominated the second half of the season and finished runners-up behind Peterborough. They then met again in the playoff final with the Phantoms winning the encounter. Lightning became the team to beat in 2009–10, despite Elite league Basingstoke Bison and Manchester Phoenix joining the EPIHL. Further squad strengthening in the form of former AIK player Monir Kalgoum and the addition of netminder Alex Mettam helped Lightning dominate and a home win against Swindon Wildcats in March 2010 saw the EPIHL league trophy return to Milton Keynes.

2010–2015: Near misses, unexpected changes and disappointment 
Despite the addition of Slovenian International Blaz Emersic, an inconsistent 2010–11 season saw Lightning finish 5th in the league and lose the play off final to Guildford Flames. 2011–12 fared no better, with the team again finishing 5th; having led the league in December. The team lost in the playoff quarter finals to eventual winners Slough Jets, despite taking a three-goal lead into the away leg. The 2012–13 season brought upheaval when just ten games into the season marque signing Adam Calder suffered a catastrophic hip injury which ended his career. Then in January 2013 Nick Poole who was by now considered a Milton Keynes Lightning legend unexpectedly announced his immediate retirement from playing. Lightning finished in 4th place and lost to Guildford Flames in the play off semi-finals.

The disruption continued in 2013–14 as home games were played in Coventry due to the renovation of the Milton Keynes rink. Due to a lack of practice ice time, the team struggled for consistency but finished in a credible 4th place. They were also the runners up to Basingstoke Bison in the cup. The 2014–15 season started with Lightning continuing to play out of Coventry. Indifferent early form left the team languishing near the bottom of the league. The refurbishment of the Milton Keynes rink was completed a month into the season and the first game back on home territory was played on 18 October 2014 against Sheffield Steeldogs in front of a capacity crowd of 2,500. Despite the return to home ice; Lightning continued to perform poorly. The loss of key players through roster changes and a series of injuries increased pressure on an already struggling team saw Lightning finish the season in 7th place, their lowest ever position. Despite poor league performances, Lightning defeated Guildford in the playoff quarter finals before losing to Manchester Phoenix in the semi final game.

2015–2017: Management change and new partnerships 
At the end of the 2014–2015 season it was announced that head coach Nick Poole would take over the duties of General Manager from Vito Rausa and be replaced by Team GB coach Peter Russell. This was shortly followed by the announcement in May 2015 that Milton Keynes Lightning would be forming a partnership with Elite League side the Coventry Blaze. This partnership lasted just one season. The 2015–16 season also saw a change from the traditional white, black, and gold colours to a white, black, and blue combination which reflected the sponsorship of local company Smith Recycling. Despite a promising start, the season ended with MKL managing just a slight improvement on their previous years final position, finishing 5th. Lightning went on to qualify for the Play Off final, losing to Guildford Flames 6–2. At the end of the season it was also announced that from the start of the 2017–2018 season, Milton Keynes Lightning would play in the Elite Ice Hockey League.

In November 2016, Nick Poole stepped down from the role of General Manager, citing that he wanted to pursue new challenges with his family outside of hockey. Lightning secured a 2nd place league finish in their final EPL season and on 18 March 2017 won their first EPL cup in a penalty shootout against Peterborough. In the playoff campaign, Lightning finished 2nd in their group, winning 5 out of 6 games to qualify for the finals weekend. Lightning would then go on to win their 5th playoff title, beating Guildford 8–3 in the semi-final and then defeating Telford in the final 7–2.

2017–2019: Elite League Hockey 
Following the announcement in May 2015, Milton Keynes Lightning formally joined the Elite League for the 2017–2018 season. With this also came a change in ownership. Planet Ice, the Milton Keynes rink operators who had run the franchise since its temporary use of the Coventry Sky Dome during the 2013–2014 season sold the club to the Midlands-based husband and wife team of Graham and Monica Moody. Lightning's inaugural season in the Elite League had a promising start but poor away form and a series of disappointing results left them languishing near the bottom of the table at the turn of the new year. The situation worsened in January when US Import Matt Nickerson had his contract terminated after an altercation with a Guildford Flames fan when leaving the ice. In February 2018 it was announced that Coach Peter Russell would be leaving the club by mutual consent at the end of the season and replaced by Canadian Doug McKay. The team finished 11th in the league and outside of the play off places.

After a poor start to the 2018–19 season, with the team languishing at the bottom of the league, Doug McKay himself parted company with Milton Keynes Lightning in November 2018 citing 'personal reasons'. Coaching responsibilities initially passed to players Ryan Lannon and Tim Wallace, with Wallace taking sole charge for the remainder of the season in January 2019. In March 2019 it was announced that MK Lightning's two-year stay in the Elite League would come to an end and that from the 2019–2020 season the team would complete in the new National Hockey League, a two import league equivalent in the British ice hockey structure to the defunct English Premier Ice Hockey League (EPIHL). The reason behind this return to the second tier of UK Ice Hockey was financial. Lightning finished the season a disappointing 11th, 24 points behind 10th placed Dundee Stars.

2019–2022: Back to its Milton Keynes roots and supporters ownership 
Soon after the completion of the 2018–2019 season and the decision to leave the Elite League, Milton Keynes Lightning announced that Lewis Clifford would be the Head Coach for the inaugural season of the new NIHL National league. Clifford had been a stalwart of the Milton Keynes Thunder team, Assistant Coach to Nick Poole at Lightning and then Head Coach at Thunder. However, before the commencement of the season, preparations were thrown into disarray with revelations of unpaid wages/reimbursements for both former players and off ice staff, outstanding debts to suppliers and poor stewardship by the owners. This led to the majority of the club's sponsors publicly denouncing the situation and declining to provide further support.

The rink operators Planet Ice also decided not to award the ice contract for the 2019–2020 season to Graham and Monica Moody but to the Supporters-based consortium formally known as the Milton Keynes Ice Hockey Club and colloquially as 'Lets Play Hockey' for them to ice a team in the NIHL National League. This consortium had been set up after the announcement that Milton Keynes Lightning would no longer ice in the Elite League and had, with the backing of Planet Ice unsuccessfully applied to operate a Milton Keynes Elite League franchise for the 2019–20 season. Shortly after the announcement, the English Ice Hockey Association confirmed that the team under the management of the Lets Play Hockey consortium had been accepted into the new NIHL National League. Once confirmation of the league place had been made, clarification was provided that Lewis Clifford would continue to be the coach under the new ownership regime. The new owners also confirmed that the team would continue using the Milton Keynes Lightning name. The 2019/20 season ended prematurely due to the COVID-19 pandemic with the team sitting in sixth position.

With the restrictions placed upon the country due to the COVID-19 pandemic, the start of the 2020/21 season was delayed. However, Lightning participated in the Streaming Series along with Sheffield Steeldogs & Swindon Wildcats in November 2020 as part of the Return to Play programme. Full post pandemic league action commenced with the 2021/22 season. Lightning iced a strong side and whilst played some excellent hockey, failed to find the consistency required to challenge for the title. The team finished 5th after dropping off the pace with a few weeks remaining of the season. Following defeat to Sheffield Steeldogs in the play off final, it was announced that Lewis Clifford would be stepping down in his duel roles as General Manager & Head Coach following a management restructuring. He was replaced by player/Director of Hockey Development Tim Wallace, who returned for a second spell as Player/Coach.

Arena redevelopment

In March 2013, Milton Keynes Council approved plans to redevelop the Leisure Plaza after failed attempts in 2006 & 2011. The development of the arena was funded by Morrisons Supermarkets and took 17 months to complete. This forced Lightning to play their home games at the Coventry Sky Dome during the 2013/2014 season & part of the 2014/2015 season. The team returned to the redeveloped rink which had been renamed the "MK Arena" on 18 October 2014 against Sheffield Steeldogs, in front of a sell out crowd in excess of 2,500.

Club honours
EPIHL League: 3
Winner (3): 2004, 2005, 2010
Runner-up (3): 2003, 2009, 2017

EPIHL Playoffs: 5
Winner (5): 2003, 2004, 2005, 2006, 2017
Runner-up (3): 2009, 2011, 2016

EPIHL Cup: 1
Winner (1): 2017
Runner-up (4): 2003, 2007, 2010, 2014

NIHL Playoffs: 0
Winner (0): 
Runner-up (1): 2022

Club roster 2022–2023

Statistical records

Top ten appearances
League, Cup, Play Offs & Streaming Series Games; as at End of Season 2022

Top ten points scorers 
League, Cup, Play Offs & Streaming Series Games; as at End of Season 2022

Top ten goal scorers
League, Cup, Play Offs & Streaming Series Games; as at End of Season 2022

Top ten goal assists 
League, Cup, Play Offs & Streaming Series Games; as at End of Season 2022

Top ten penalty minutes 
League, Cup, Play Offs & Streaming Series Games; as at End of Season 2022

Top ten points to game ratio 
League, Cup, Play Offs & Streaming Series Games; as at End of Season 2022 (Players with under 20 appearances not included)

Top ten goals to game ratio 
League, Cup, Play Offs & Streaming Series Games; as at End of Season 2022 (Players with under 20 appearances not included)

Top ten assists to game ratio 
League, Cup, Play Offs & Streaming Series Games; as at End of Season 2022 (Players with under 20 appearances not included)

Top ten penalty minutes to games ratio 
League, Cup, Play Offs & Streaming Series Games; as at End of Season 2022 (Players with under 20 appearances not included)

Top ten save percentages 
League, Cup, Play Offs & Streaming Series Games; as at End of Season 2022 (Players with under 20 appearances not included)

NHL drafted Milton Keynes Lightning players

Retired numbers

Head coaches

Club captains

Season-by-season record

Associated teams
Milton Keynes Thunder
Milton Keynes Storm

References

External links
MK Lightning Homepage
MKIH Forums
Planet Ice

 
Ice hockey teams in England
Sport in Milton Keynes
EPIHL teams
2002 establishments in England
Ice hockey clubs established in 2002